The Czech Republic has submitted films for the Academy Award for Best International Feature Film since 1994 (after the split of Czechoslovakia in January 1993). However, there were also Czech films submitted by Czechoslovakia before it ceased to exist in 1992.

The award is handed out annually by the United States Academy of Motion Picture Arts and Sciences to a feature-length motion picture produced outside the United States that contains primarily non-English dialogue. It was not created until the 1956 Academy Awards, in which a competitive Academy Award of Merit, known as the Best Foreign Language Film Award, was created for non-English speaking films, and has been given annually since.

, three Czech films have been nominated for the Academy Award for Best Foreign Language Film, one of which, Jan Svěrák's Kolya, has won the award. Another of Svěrák's films, Dark Blue World, was submitted to the Academy for the 74th Academy Awards, but not accepted as a nominee. The two other Czech directors to have films accepted as nominees are Jan Hřebejk and Ondřej Trojan. Hřebejk's Divided We Fall was accepted as a nominee for the 73rd Academy Awards, but his submission for the 77th Academy Awards, Up and Down, was not. Trojan's Želary was a nominee for the 76th Academy Awards.

Prior to becoming a separate state in 1993, the Czech Republic was part of Czechoslovakia, which submitted twenty-three films for Oscar consideration between 1964 and 1991. All films chosen during this era had significant input from actors, directors and crew from the Czech Republic and several of them won the Academy Award like Closely Watched Trains in 1967 and The Shop on Main Street, a Slovak-language production from 1965.

Submissions
The Academy of Motion Picture Arts and Sciences has invited the film industries of various countries to submit their best film for the Academy Award for Best Foreign Language Film since 1956. The Foreign Language Film Award Committee oversees the process and reviews all the submitted films. Following this, they vote via secret ballot to determine the five nominees for the award. Below is a list of the films that have been submitted by the Czech Republic for review by the Academy for the award by the year of the submission and the respective Academy Award ceremony.

See also
List of Czechoslovak submissions for the Academy Award for Best Foreign Language Film
List of Academy Award winners and nominees for Best Foreign Language Film
List of Academy Award-winning foreign language films
Cinema of the Czech Republic

Notes

References
General

Specific

External links
The Official Academy Awards Database
The Motion Picture Credits Database
IMDb Academy Awards Page

Czech
Academy